The Italian Liberal Right (DLI) or, simply, Liberal Right, is a minor conservative-liberal political party in Italy.

History
The party was founded in 1994 by members of the right-wing of the Italian Liberal Party (PLI). Leading members included Gabriele Pagliuzzi, Giuseppe Basini, Luciano Magnalbò and Saverio Porcari Lidestri. The DLI soon allied itself with the National Alliance (AN), of which it became the liberal faction. In the 1994, 1996 and 2001 general elections, some members of DLI, including Pagliuzzi, Basini and Magnalbò were elected in the Italian Parliament for AN.

In 2001 Pagliuzzi and Basini left AN, due to their exclusion from party lists for the general election, and re-established DLI, renaming it the Liberal Right – Liberals for Italy (Destra Liberale – Liberali per l'Italia, DL-LpI). Basini left the DL-LpI in 2004 in order to join the re-established Italian Liberal Party of Stefano De Luca, while Pagliuzzi remained in charge of party leadership. Magnalbò was a senator for AN until 2006 and then joined the new PLI in 2007 too.

By 2007 DL-LpI had become a tiny liberal political action committee. Eugenio Riccio (former member of the Italian Social Movement and later of AN) joined Pagliuzzi in a convention on the future of the party. The most likely options were either a merger with The Right or with The People of Freedom (PdL). Lately in 2007, the party was re-named Italian Liberal Right, its original name. In 2011 Pagliuzzi led his group into the PdL.

In 2019 Basini, Anna Cinzia Bonfrisco and Arturo Diaconale re-launched DLI as an internal faction and/or associate party of Lega.

Ideology
DLI is a conservative-liberal party expousing a vigorous patriotism and a strong support for economic liberalism. These two elements put together can lead to classification the party's ideology as national liberalism. As heirs of the right-wing liberal tradition of Italy, DLI members were keen on supporting national identity and centralism, thus they strongly opposed any form of federalism and proposed the abolition of the Regions, including those with special statute, and the Provinces in Italy. In the latest political program, possibly due to the alliance with the federalist Lega, these proposals are not included.

Leadership
President: Giuseppe Basini (1994–2004), Gabriele Pagliuzzi (2004–2011), Cinzia Bonfrisco (2019–present)
Honorary President: Giuseppe Basini (2019–present)
President of the National Council: Gabriele Pagliuzzi (2019–present)
Secretary: Gabriele Pagliuzzi (1994–2004), Michele Gelardi (2019–present)

References

External links
Official website
Former official website

See also
Liberalism and radicalism in Italy

Defunct political parties in Italy
National Alliance (Italy) factions
Liberal parties in Italy
Political parties established in 1994
1994 establishments in Italy
2011 disestablishments in Italy
Political parties disestablished in 2011
Conservative liberal parties
National liberal parties